The Mall at Turtle Creek was an enclosed shopping mall in Jonesboro, Arkansas, that closed in 2020 due to tornado damage. Currently, the only stores in operation at Turtle Creek are JCPenney, Dillard's and Target.  All four bus routes of the Jonesboro Economical Transit system serve the location.

Layout
The mall was rectangular and stretched over a  plot. The developers wanted to give the mall a "Main Street" look, with 100 stores arranged along two sides of the mall facing each other, a pedestrian walkway on each side, and various vendors occupying the mid-aisles. The mall was constructed with Dillard's anchoring the east end of the mall, Target anchoring the west end of the mall, and JCPenney anchoring the southwest end of the mall. Along with the three main anchors, the mall included three junior anchors: Best Buy, Barnes & Noble, and Bed Bath & Beyond, all along the southeast end.

History
Construction of the mall began in September 2004. Target and JCPenney opened their stores in late 2005, and Dillard's opened its store early in 2006. The rest of the mall held its grand opening in March 2006. The mall is notable for being the only enclosed mall to open in the country that year. Rouse Properties purchased the mall from its original owners, David Hocker & Associates, in February 2013. In 2016, Brookfield Properties acquired Rouse Properties and its portfolio, including The Mall at Turtle Creek.

2020 tornado 

At approximately 5:00 p.m. CDT on March 28, 2020, an EF3 tornado swept through the east side of Jonesboro, impacting the mall, Jonesboro Municipal Airport, and nearby commercial and residential areas. The tornado was categorized as an EF2 when it struck the mall, causing significant damage to the main entrance and most of its retail stores.  In the preceding days, the mall had been temporarily closed due to COVID-19 pandemic restrictions and was nearly empty of customers. The tornado caused 22 injuries in Jonesboro and resulted in no fatalities. Dillard's, JCPenney, and Target have since reopened. On September 4, 2020, it was announced that Barnes & Noble would not reopen.

Fate of the mall 
After the mall was hit by a tornado, the only stores that reopened were JCPenney, Target, and Dillard's. Ten months after the tornado, the city of Jonesboro issued a 30-day notice to mall owners Brookfield Properties, ordering the property to be cleaned up. Three months after the notice, the cleanup process began. As of 2022, two years after the tornado, the mall has yet to be rebuilt and resembles a construction site. Jonesboro Mayor Harold Copenhaver stated he has encouraged Brookfield Properties to rebuild the mall, but stated the city has limited options because Brookfield Properties is a private organization. According to KAIT8, Brookfield Properties had no comment on the mall, nor its future.

See also
Indian Mall

References

Shopping malls established in 2006
Shopping malls disestablished in 2020
Defunct shopping malls in the United States
Buildings and structures in Jonesboro, Arkansas
Shopping malls in Arkansas
Brookfield Properties
2006 establishments in Arkansas
Tourist attractions in Craighead County, Arkansas